Faraz Emamali is an Iranian football forward who currently plays for Iranian football club Mes Rafsanjan in the Persian Gulf Pro League.

Club career

Paykan
Emamali started his career with Paykan from youth levels. He was promoted to the first team after shining in the Tehran Asia Vision Super League with Paykan, where he scored 27 times with U19s and 14 times with U21s. He made his professional debut for Paykan on November 21, 2014 against Esteghlal Khuzestan as a substitute for Jahangir Asgari.

Club career statistics

References

External links
 Faraz Emamali at PersianLeague.com
 Faraz Emamali at IranLeague.ir
 Faraz Emamali On Instagram

Living people
Iranian footballers
Paykan F.C. players
1995 births
Iran under-20 international footballers
Association football forwards
Mes Rafsanjan players